Doing The Most is the independent debut studio album by American singer-songwriter Kirby Maurier, released on July 31, 2015 by Valholla Entertainment.

Doing The Most features production entirely by Haitian-American producer-songwriter Vegas Fontaine. All of the songs were written by Maurier with the exception of "Iz U Wit It" which was co-written by Fontaine. Valholla Entertainment Chairman and CEO Vince Valholla serves as the album's executive producer alongside Maurier and Fontaine.

Current singles from the album include "Iz U Wit It" "S.P.P. (Sweet Potato Pie)" and "Paradise". Upon its release, Doing The Most earned regional success within the United States.

Track listing
Credits adapted from Maurier's official Doing The Most digital booklet.

References

2015 debut albums
Rhythm and blues albums by American artists